Patrick McGaw (born September 13, 1967) is an American actor. He is best known for his role as Neutron in the 1995 film The Basketball Diaries and as Doug Gordon in the 1996 film Malicious.

Career 
McGaw appeared in the films Amongst Friends (1993) (his first acting credit), Scorpion Spring (1996) and Dream with the Fishes (1997).

From 1997 to 1998, McGaw was a regular cast member on the Steven Bochco-produced police drama, Brooklyn South, playing Terry Doyle. He then guest starred in the series Chicken Soup for the Soul in 2000 and CSI: Crime Scene Investigation in 2008, which is his last acting credit to date.

Filmography

Film

Television

Video games

References

External links

1967 births
Living people
20th-century American male actors
21st-century American male actors
American male film actors
American male television actors
Place of birth missing (living people)